Talat Yot is a khwaeng (subdistrict) of Phra Nakhon District, Bangkok, considered to be majority area of Bang Lamphu neighbourhood.

History
Its name after Talat Yot, a large marketplace that used to be located in this area. It was also known as Bang Lumphu.  At the beginning it was just a small market, later during the reign of King Nangklao (Rama III) it grew into a bigger market, and there was a major improvement in the year 1902.

Talat Yot was a large market in the inner Bangkok (Rattanakosin Island) in those days. There was a wide variety of goods trading, such as both fresh and dried foods, flowers, incenses and candles, various Thai desserts, gold and jewelry stores, leather stores, fabric shops. They starting from small stores and successively develop, until the reign of King Vajiravudh (Rama VI) therefore became an important trading centre to date. Moreover, there was another important market near Talat Yot called Talat Norarat, a fruit market outside Rattanakosin Island.

In the 1970s, Bang Lamphu consists of three main markets, namely Talat Yot, Talat Turian (durian market), and Talat Nana. For Talat Nana, its name is derived from the surname of Lek Nana, a Thai-Indian politician and real estate entrepreneur, who was an owner. It closed down in the 1980s.

Geography
Neighbouring subdistricts are (from the north clockwise): Wat Sam Phraya, Ban Phan Thom (across Khlong Bang Lamphu), Bowon Niwet, Phra Borom Maha Ratchawang, and Chana Songkhram.

Places

Khaosan Road
Rambuttri Road and Rong Mai Lane
Tang Hua Seng Department Store 
Phra Sumen Road
Tani Road
Chakrabongse Road
Kraisi Road and Kraisi Alley
Sip Sam Hang Road
Chana Songkhram Metropolitan Police Station
Tanao Road
Ratchadamnoen Avenue
Khok Wua Intersection
Norarat Sathan Bridge
BMA Parking Garage

References

Phra Nakhon district
Subdistricts of Bangkok